Haigang may refer to:

Haigang District, a district of Qinhuangdao, Hebei, China
Haigang Town, in Haigang District
On the Docks, a Chinese revolutionary opera created during the Cultural Revolution

See also
Harbour City (Hong Kong), a shopping centre with this Chinese name in Tsim Sha Tsui, Kowloon, Hong Kong
Harbour Centre Development, a Hong Kong company with this Chinese name